Samlout or Samlot is a district (srok) of Battambang Province, in northwestern Cambodia.

Administration 
The district is subdivided into 7 communes (khum) and 49 villages (phum). Due to conflict, census enumeration could not be conducted in Samlout district during the 1998 Census.

Communes and villages

Development efforts 
In 2021, Angelina Jolie told People Magazine that she plans to return to Cambodia to establish the next “Women for Bees” program in the Samlout region to raise awareness of conservation efforts. Women for Bees aims to train 50 women beekeepers within five years and build 2,500 hives in 25 UNESCO biosphere reserves around the world, including Cambodia.

References

 
Districts of Battambang province